Ruta Nacional 3 ("National Route 3") is an Argentine highway, stretching from the eastern side of the country in Buenos Aires, crossing the provinces of Buenos Aires, Río Negro, Chubut Province, Santa Cruz and Tierra del Fuego. Since its start at Avenida General Paz (A001) until the end, on the bridge over Lapataia River, it measures .

After National Decree 1931 of 3 August 1983, this road is called Comandante Luis Piedrabuena south of National Route 22, that is starting at km marker 719.

Cities
These are the main (over 5,000 inhabitants) cities and towns joined by this route, North to South. In the provinces of Santa Cruz and Tierra del Fuego towns under 5,000 inhabitants are marked in italics.

Buenos Aires Province

Length:  (from km marker 14 to 963).

 La Matanza Partido: San Justo (km 17), Isidro Casanova (km 19), Gregorio de Laferrere (km 26), González Catán (km 32), Virrey del Pino (km 38).
 Marcos Paz Partido: no towns over 5,000 people.
 Cañuelas Partido: Cañuelas (km 63-66).
 Monte Partido: San Miguel del Monte (km 109-112)
 General Belgrano Partido: no towns over 5,000 people.
 Las Flores Partido: Las Flores (km 187).
 Azul Partido: Azul (km 299).
 Benito Juárez Partido: Benito Juárez (km 399-401).
 Adolfo Gonzales Chaves Partido: Adolfo Gonzales Chaves (km 450).
 Tres Arroyos Partido: Tres Arroyos (km 491-496).
 Coronel Dorrego Partido: Coronel Dorrego (km 593).
 Coronel Rosales Partido: no towns over 5,000 people.
 Bahía Blanca Partido: access to Port of Ingeniero White (km 677) over National Route 252, Bahía Blanca (km 681-695), access to General Daniel Cerri (km 698).
 Villarino Partido: no towns over 5,000 people.
 Patagones Partido: Carmen de Patagones (km 962).

Río Negro Province

Length: (km 963-1304)

 Adolfo Alsina Department: Viedma (km 966).
 San Antonio Department: access to San Antonio Oeste (km 1139) and Sierra Grande (km 1265).

Chubut Province
Length:  (km 1304-km 1856)

 Biedma Department: access to Puerto Madryn (km 1394).
 Rawson Department: Trelew (km 1451) and access to Rawson (km 1456).
 Gaiman Department: no towns over 5,000 people.
 Florentino Ameghino Department: no towns over 5,000 people.
 Escalante Department: Comodoro Rivadavia (km 1831-1838) and Rada Tilly (km 1843).

Santa Cruz Province
 
Length:  (km 1856-km 2674)

 Deseado Department: Caleta Olivia (km 1908-1911).
 Magallanes Department: access to Puerto San Julián (km 2252).
 Corpen Aike Department: Comandante Luis Piedrabuena (km 2372).
 Güer Aike Department: Río Gallegos (km 2607-2609).

Tierra del Fuego Province
Length:  (km 2696-km 3059).

 Río Grande Department: access to San Sebastián (Chile) (km 2740), Río Grande (km 2818) and Tolhuin (km 2934).
 Ushuaia Department: Ushuaia (km 3036-3041).

Tolls
In 1990 administration and maintenance of the most travelled roads was given to private companies with rights to collect tolls dividing the areas in "Corredores Viales" ("road corridors").  "Servicios de Mantenimiento de Carreteras" (Semacar) company, took charge of Corridor number 1, which includes Route 3 between km markers 19 and 677, in Buenos Aires Province, from the joining with Provincial Route 4 in San Justo to Bahía Blanca, with tolls collected in Cañuelas (km marker 78), Azul (km marker 263) and Tres Arroyos (km marker 523).,

In 2003 the concession contracts expired, which led to a modification of corridor numbers and a call for a new public bid.  Corridor Vial number 1 is now given to "Empresa Rutas al Sur" and runs from km marker 62 to 677 which corresponds to the crossing of Provincial Route 6 in Cañuelas until it joins National Route 252 in Grünbein.

References

National roads in Buenos Aires Province
National roads in Río Negro Province
National roads in Chubut Province
National roads in Santa Cruz Province, Argentina
National roads in Tierra del Fuego Province, Argentina
Tourism in Argentina